The Dallas Diesel is an American football team, founded in 1997, which plays in the Midwest Division of the Impact Conference in the Gridiron Developmental Football League (GDFL). The team is also known as the DTF Diesel. The team is the 2006 NAFL champion. The Diesel defeated the Nashville Storm 24-19 in the championship game played at the Wide World of Sports Complex at Walt Disney World in October 2006. Kicker Sean Riley was the leading scorer for 2006.

History
Jewell Portwood was the owner and coached the team from 1997 to 2008. Coach Portwood was inducted into the Minor League Football News Hall of Fame in 2004 and has a record of 163 wins against 39 losses. He was named "Coach of the Year" in 2006 by National Football Events and is considered a pioneer and innovator in minor league football. Portwood retired and, as owner, named Jackie Bridges as his successor. Jackie Bridges took over as coach for the 2009 season. They played the Oklahoma Thunder of the World Football League for the World Bowl title in 2009 but were defeated. The team returned to action in 2011 as part of the Gridiron Developmental Football League.

Stadium
Home games are played at the newly renovated Clark Stadium in Plano, Texas.  This is a 14,442 capacity stadium, built in 1977. The playing surface is "state of the art" field turf.

Season summaries

1997
 International Football League Play-off Team (8 – 3 Record)
 1st Round Play-off Participant

1998
 International Football League Play-off Team (9 – 3 Record)
 Southwestern Division Champion
 IFL Final Four Team
 12 Players Named to IFL West All Star Team
 Coach Selected as Head Coach of IFL West All Star Team

1999
 North American Football League Play-off Team (8 – 5 Record)
 NAFL Final Four Team
 6 Players Named to NAFL West All Star Team
 1 Player Sign with PIFL Team

2000
 North American Football League Play-off Team (11 – 3 Record)
 3rd Round Play-off Participant
 4 Players Sign with PIFL Teams

2001
 North American Football League Play-off Team (8 – 4 Record)
 North Texas Division Champion
 3rd Round Play-off Participant
 4 Players Sign with AFL2 Team

2002
 North American Football League Play-off Team (12 – 3 Record)
 North Texas Division Champion
 3rd Round Play-off Participant
 Player Named NAFL Defensive MVP
 Player Named NAFL League MVP
 Richard Simpson Named NAFL Special Teams MVP
 12 Players Named All League 1st Team
 10 Players Selected to Play in 1st Texas vs Louisiana All Star Game

2003
 North American Football League Play-off Team (9 – 3 Record)
 2nd Memphis in May Bar-B-Q Bowl Winner
 North Texas Division Champion
 1st Round Play-off Participant
 3 Players Named to NAFL West All Star Team
 15 Players Selected to Play in 2nd Texas vs Louisiana All Star Game
 Coach Selected as Head Coach of Texas All Stars

2004
 North American Football League Play-off Team (17 – 1 Record)
 North Texas Division Champion
 3rd Round Play-off Participant
 10 Players Named to NAFL West All Star Team
 Coaching Staff Selected to NAFL West All Star Coaching Staff
 Head Coach wins 100th Semi-Pro Game (finishes season with 106)
 Head Coach Inducted Into Minor League Football News Hall of Fame

2005
 North American Football League Play-off Team (13 – 1 Record)
 Texas Lonestar Division Champion
 4th Round (Elite Eight) Play-off Participant
 20 Players Named to NAFL West All Star Team
 Coaching Staff Selected to NAFL West All Star Coaching Staff
 Player Named NAFL West All Star Offensive MVP

2006
 North American Football League National Champions
 Player Named NAFL Offensive MVP of Championship Game
 Player Named NAFL Defensive MVP of Championship Game
 North American Football League Play-off Team (15 – 1 Record)
 Western Conference Champion
 Southwest Region Champion
 Texas Division Champion
 Texas Lonestar Division Champion
 30 Players Named to NAFL West All Star Team
 Team Ranked #1 in the Nation by Minor League Football News
 Team Ranked #1 in the Nation by Football News Events
 Head Coach Named 2006 Coach of the Year by Minor League Football News
 Player Named 2006 Defensive MVP of the Year by Minor League Football News

2007
Schedule

Pre-Season
6/23 St.Louis Bulldogs
Regular Season
7/7   South Texas Mutiny
7/14 @ Houston Sharks
7/21 BYE
7/28 @ Lubbock Rangers
8/4   Hutto Bulldogs
8/11 @ South Texas Mutiny
8/18 Houston Sharks **
8/25 @ Bay Area Gamblers
9/1   BYE
9/8   Lubbock Rangers**
9/15 @ Hutto Bulldogs
9/22 Bay Area Gamblers
9/29 Make Up Game (If Necessary)
Playoffs
10/6    Round 1
10/13  Round 2
10/20  Round 3 "Elite 8"
10/27  Round 4 "Final Four"
11/3    Bye
11/10  Championship Game

2008 schedule
5/31 Loss @ Austin Gamebreakers 25-35
6/7 Win Texarkana Warriors 21-12
6/14 Louisiana Lightning
6/21 @ Texas Bulldogs
6/28 San Antonio Warriors
7/19 @ Arkansas Warcats
7/26 @ Oklahoma Thunder
8/2 Austin Gamebreakers
8/9 @ Southeast Texas Demons
8/16 Texas Bulldogs

2011 season
Team moved to the Gridiron Developmental Football League. Defeated by the Oklahoma Thunder in the second round of the playoffs.

References

External links
Dallas Diesel homepage
WFL homepage
Home page
NAFL home page

Rockwall County, Texas
North American Football League teams
American football teams established in 1997
American football teams in the Dallas–Fort Worth metroplex
Semi-professional American football
World Football League (2008–2010)
1997 establishments in Texas